"The Play" was a last-second, game-winning kickoff return for a touchdown that occurred during a college football game between the Stanford Cardinal and California Golden Bears on Saturday, November 20, 1982. Given the circumstances and rivalry, the wild game that preceded it, the very unusual way in which "The Play" unfolded, and its lingering aftermath on players and fans, it is recognized as one of the most memorable plays in college football history and among the most memorable in American sports.

Stanford had taken a 20–19 lead on a field goal with four seconds left. The Golden Bears used five lateral passes on the ensuing kickoff return to score the winning touchdown in the game's final seconds and earn a 25–20 victory. Believing that the game was over, members of the Stanford Band came onto the field midway through the return, which added to the confusion and folklore. There remains disagreement over the legality of two of Cal's backward pass attempts, adding to the passion surrounding the traditional rivalry of the annual "Big Game."

Background

This was the two teams' 85th Big Game, and was played on Cal's home field, California Memorial Stadium. Although Cal was guaranteed a winning record (with bowl eligibility) for the season, no bowl game was looking to invite them. The implications of this game were far more important to Stanford, led by quarterback John Elway, who was playing in his last regular season college game before heading off to become a future National Football League star enshrined in both the Pro Football Hall of Fame and College Football Hall of Fame. The Cardinal football squad was in the midst of an exciting season—they were 5–5 but had victories over highly ranked Ohio State and Washington—and needed one more win to be eligible to play in a bowl game. Representatives of the Hall of Fame Classic committee were in attendance, apparently to extend an invitation to Stanford to play Vanderbilt, if the Cardinal won.

Also at stake was possession of the Stanford Axe, an axe-head trophy that is awarded to the winner of this annual matchup. Its origins date back to 1899, but in 1933, after years of increasingly more elaborate thefts of the Axe by students from one or the other school, the two schools agreed that the winner of the Big Game would take possession of the Axe. The plaque upon which the Axe is mounted carries the scores of previous Big Games.

Game summary
Cal took a 10–0 lead at the half on a field goal (after having one blocked on its first drive) and a two-play 55-yard touchdown drive that consisted of long passes from Gale Gilbert to Mariet Ford, including a diving catch by Ford in the endzone.

Cal missed another field goal on its first drive of the second half, which was answered by an 80-yard touchdown drive by Stanford for the Cardinal's first score of the game. The drive included a controversial catch by Mike Tolliver, who appeared to have been out of bounds, and was capped by back-to-back passes from John Elway to running back Vincent White.

Stanford took its first lead of the game, 14–10, on another touchdown reception by White, but relinquished the lead after a Cal field goal and a touchdown pass from Gilbert to Wes Howell, to make the score 19–14 Cal.

A failed two-point conversion by Cal after their latest touchdown loomed large, when Stanford subsequently cut the Cal lead to 19–17 on a field goal and was thus just another field goal away from re-taking the lead.

After losing the ball on a fumble on its next possession, Stanford got the ball back on its own 20-yard line with 1:27 left on the clock. At that point, the lead had changed twice in the second half and would do so two more times in the game's final moments.

The situation
With Cal leading 19–17 late in the fourth quarter, Elway and the Cardinal had one final chance to score the go-ahead points. Needing just a field goal to win, Elway overcame an early fourth and long deep in Stanford territory and eventually got the Cardinal to the Golden Bears' 23-yard line. With eight seconds remaining, Stanford kicker Mark Harmon lined up for what appeared to be the winning kick, and he hit the field goal to give the Cardinal a 20–19 lead.

However, two things happened that would play into what would follow. Elway had been instructed by head coach Paul Wiggin to call timeout with eight seconds left to give his team two chances to kick in case the snap was botched on the attempt; if he had waited an additional four seconds to call the timeout, Harmon's kick would have been the final play of the game and Stanford would have won. Not only that, but Stanford was called for an unsportsmanlike conduct penalty after the play was over, which meant that not only would they have to kick it back to Cal, but they would have to do so placed fifteen yards further back than normal. Since Harmon was likely to execute a squib kick on the ensuing kickoff, this meant that Cal would not have had as great a distance to cover once the kick was fielded. 

Still, with only four seconds left on the clock the Golden Bears would almost certainly need to score a touchdown on the ensuing kickoff to win barring any defensive penalty; with the unlikelihood of that happening, Cal radio announcer Joe Starkey remarked on KGO radio that "only a miracle" would help. As the teams got ready for the kickoff, Cal defensive back Richard Rodgers told the rest of the special teams players, "Don't get tackled with the ball." 

Cal rushed onto the field without having eleven players on their special teams unit, which defensive back and return man Kevin Moen spotted right away. When he noticed this, he moved a few yards away from his normal position. As was expected, Harmon executed the squib kick. The ball bounced right to Moen, who fielded it at the Cal 45. 

Here is the sequence that followed. 

Moen tried and failed to make any progress with the ball. He spotted Rodgers to his left and  lateraled the ball to him. 
Rodgers was very quickly surrounded, gaining only one yard before looking behind him for Dwight Garner, who caught the ball around the Cal 45.
Garner ran straight ahead for five yards, but was surrounded by five Stanford players. However, while being tackled, he managed to pitch the ball back to Rodgers. It was at this moment, believing that Garner had been tackled and the game was over, that several Stanford players on the sideline and the entire Stanford band (which had been waiting behind the south end zone) ran onto the field in celebration.
Rodgers dodged another Stanford player and took the ball to his right, toward the middle of the field, where at least four other Cal players were ready for the next pitch. Around the Stanford 45, Rodgers pitched the ball to Mariet Ford, who caught it in stride. Meanwhile, the Stanford band, all 144 members, had run out past the south end zone—the one the Cal players were trying to get to—and had advanced as far as twenty yards downfield. The scrum of players was moving towards them.
Ford avoided a Stanford player and sprinted upfield while moving to the right of the right hash mark, and into the band, which was scattered all over the south end of the field. Around the Stanford 27, three Stanford players smothered Ford, but while falling forward he threw a blind lateral over his right shoulder.
Also on the field were "several Stanford cheerleaders, assorted spectators, three members of the Stanford Axe Committee" and "at least 11 illegal players who had wandered onto the field."
Moen caught it at about the 25 and charged toward the end zone. One Stanford player missed him, and another could not catch him from behind. Moen ran through the scattering Stanford Band members for the touchdown, which he famously completed by running into unaware trombone player Gary Tyrrell.

The Cal players celebrated wildly—but the officials had not signaled the touchdown. Stanford coach Paul Wiggin and his players argued to the officials that Dwight Garner's knee had been down, negating what had happened during the rest of the play. Meanwhile, the officials huddled. The chaos at the end of The Play made the officials' task very challenging. In particular, the questionable fifth lateral took place in the midst of the Stanford band, greatly reducing visibility. Referee Charles Moffett recalled the moment:

Moffett signaled the touchdown, rendering the illegal participation penalty on Stanford irrelevant and ending the game, making the final score 25–20 in favor of Cal.

Controversy

The officials' ruling of a Cal touchdown was highly controversial at the time, and The Play has remained a source of often intense disagreement throughout the intervening decades, particularly between ardent Stanford and Cal fans. The controversy centers on the legality of two of the five laterals as well as on the chaos that ensued when the Stanford team and band entered the playing field while the ball was still live.

Many Stanford players and coaches objected immediately to the third lateral, from Dwight Garner to Richard Rodgers, asserting that Garner's knee was down moments beforehand. Kevin Lamar, a Stanford player who was in on the tackle, maintains that Garner's knee had hit the turf while he was still in possession of the ball; Garner and Rodgers themselves, however, assert the opposite. TV replays were inconclusive; due to the distance from the camera and the swarm of tacklers, one cannot see the exact moment Garner's knee may have touched.

Afterward, upon viewing the game footage, many suggested that the fifth lateral, from Mariet Ford to Kevin Moen, had been an illegal forward pass. Ford was about to be tackled at about the 27.5-yard-line when he released his blind, over-the-shoulder heave, which Moen appeared to catch while crossing the 25. Because both players were in full stride, and because the lateral traveled some distance from the 27.5 to the 25 yard line, many thought the ball had gone forward. Under the rules of football, the direction of a pass is judged relative to the field. Complicating this for the referees on the spot, however, was the fact that Ford tossed the ball back over his shoulder while falling forward, while Moen reached backwards to catch it, thus making it difficult to tell whether or not the ball itself traveled forward, not sideways or backwards. To be a forward pass, the ball must travel forward; a ball that travels laterally is legal. 

Finally, while the replay of the tackle of Garner is not conclusive, Stanford was clearly guilty of illegal participation, both from too many players on the field and the band. At least two game officials immediately threw penalty flags on Stanford for having too many men on the field. A football game cannot end on a defensive penalty (unless it is declined), so had any of the Cal ball-carriers been tackled short of the end zone from this point on, Cal would have been granted at least one unclocked play from scrimmage, and perhaps a touchdown outright for outside interference. The game referee, Charles Moffett, noted this as a likely outcome in a subsequent interview (see above). Rule 9-1, Article 4 of the official NCAA football rules, "Illegal Interference", allows the referee to award a score if "equitable" after an act of interference. For example, officials in the 1954 Cotton Bowl Classic awarded a touchdown to Rice after an Alabama player jumped onto the field from the sideline to tackle Rice running back Dickey Maegle as he was running toward a touchdown.

The NCAA's instant replay rules were not adopted until 2005, more than two decades later, so the officials could not consult recorded television footage to resolve these issues. It is unclear whether instant replay would have had any impact, as a field ruling cannot be overturned unless there is "indisputable video evidence" to the contrary.

Analysis of the controversy
Many attempts have been made to analyze the disputed areas of The Play and resolve its controversies. This has proven to be a difficult task for several reasons. Only one television replay is available, and it is from a distant and elevated midfield camera. The rules of college football do not precisely cover The Play's bizarre final seconds. Finally, the intense passion from both Cal and Stanford fans often make objective analysis of The Play a great challenge.

Among the notable attempts at deconstructing The Play are:
The national magazine Sports Illustrated, as part of a 12-page article that appeared the following fall ("The Anatomy of a Miracle," September 1, 1983), found no mistakes in officiating. Cal's only error was having four men in the restraining area before kickoff, an issue that did not result in a penalty. In the article, Garner said that his knee was parallel to the ground when he tossed the third lateral. Of the fifth lateral, SI determined, that it was "clearly thrown backwards" and would have hit the 27 had Moen not caught it.
ABC, as part of the show prepared for the award of "Pontiac's Ultimate High-Performance Play of the NCAA", analyzed the video of the fifth lateral from Ford to Moen and concluded that the ball traveled laterally along the 25-yard line, thus making it a legal action.
In 2007, as part of the buildup to The Play's 25th anniversary, the Bay Area News Group asked Verle Sorgen, the Pac-10 Conference's supervisor of instant replay, to review the two disputed laterals according to modern NCAA instant replay review rules. (Sorgen was not asked to rule on the larger issue of the Stanford band's outside interference.) After watching enhanced footage on a modern, large-screen monitor, Sorgen opined that there was insufficient video evidence to overturn the third lateral, from Garner to Rodgers. However, Sorgen believed that the fifth lateral from Ford to Moen "was released at the 22 [probably meant “27”] and touched at the 20-1/2 [probably meant “25-1/2”]. From that, it clearly appears forward." Asked for his "ultimate call", Sorgen replied, "I would be tempted to reverse it...then go out and get the motor running in my car."
A detailed review of the views of the referees who officiated the game, and The Play, was published in Fall 2022.  In interviews they do not indicate that they would upon reflection have changed their collective no-call against Cal.

Aftermath

Four days after the game, students at The Stanford Daily published a bogus version of Cal's student newspaper, The Daily Californian, with the lead story claiming that the NCAA had declared Cal's last play to be dead in a ruling three days after the game. According to that bogus paper, the official score would be recorded in the NCAA record books as Stanford 20, California 19. The Stanford students then distributed 7,000 copies of the phony "extra" on the Cal campus. A few days later, blue and gold t-shirts depicting the play with Xs and Os (much like a coach's diagram) complete with squiggly lines for the laterals, appeared in the Cal bookstore and throughout the Bay Area.

The season after The Play, Stanford went 1–10 and Paul Wiggin was fired. Wiggin later said The Play "had a big effect on our program, especially on recruiting." Athletics director Andy Geiger said the loss devastated the program. Others blamed the loss on the Stanford Band. Of the band's role, Geiger said, "Although the Band did not cause the Play, it was typical that they would have been in the wrong place at the wrong time." The incumbent Stanford band manager now annually passes his or her position to the new manager with 4 seconds left in the Stanford–Cal game.

Whenever Stanford holds the Stanford Axe, the plaque is altered in protest so that the outcome reads as a 20–19 Stanford victory. When the Axe is returned to Cal's possession, the plaque is changed back to the official score: California 25, Stanford 20.

For many years, John Elway was bitter, on both a personal level and on behalf of his team, about the touchdown being allowed: "This was an insult to college football... They [the officials] ruined my last game as a college football player." The Play cost Stanford an invitation to the Hall of Fame Classic, in addition to a winning season, and Elway completed his college career having never played in a bowl game. Geiger said that the loss cost Elway the Heisman Trophy. Elway would nevertheless enjoy a tremendously successful NFL career, winning two Super Bowls with the Denver Broncos, and was inducted into the Pro Football and College Football Halls of Fame. Years later, Elway came to terms with The Play, stating that "each year it gets a little funnier."

The participants in The Play faded into relative obscurity in the years since, with the only memorable participants in the game being Elway and announcer Joe Starkey for his famous call of The Play.

Ron Rivera, a starting linebacker for California, went on to play for the 1985 Chicago Bears who went 15–1 during the regular season and won Super Bowl XX. He has since been a head coach for the Carolina Panthers and Washington Commanders of the NFL, and was named NFL Coach of the Year in 2013 and 2015.

Emile Harry, Stanford wide receiver, after graduating '85, was drafted with the 89th pick by the Atlanta Falcons, then went on to play 8 seasons for the Kansas City Chiefs.

Gary Plummer, a linebacker for the Golden Bears, was drafted into the United States Football League in 1983. He played 8 seasons with the San Diego Chargers before joining the San Francisco 49ers in 1994, as part of their Super Bowl XXIX winning team. Plummer retired from the NFL after the 1997 season.

The most infamous participant in The Play is Mariet Ford, who also caught 7 passes for 132 yards and a touchdown in the game. Ford, who briefly played wide receiver for the Oakland Invaders of the United States Football League, was convicted of murdering his pregnant wife and 3-year-old son in 1997. He is serving a 45 years-to-life sentence.

Kevin Moen had a short-lived professional career and is now a real estate broker in the Los Angeles area. In 2002, he coached the Palos Verdes Colts, a Pop Warner football team. He was also the head football coach at Palos Verdes Peninsula High School, starting in the 2008–2009 school year.

Gary Tyrrell, the Stanford trombonist run over by Moen, is a venture capital firm CFO and amateur brewer. He became friends with Moen and Cal coach Joe Kapp. He appeared on television's The Tonight Show along with the key Cal players shortly after The Play; his smashed trombone is now displayed in the College Football Hall of Fame. He has also said, "I thought I'd be famous for my talent as a musician, not for being knocked down at a football game."

Dwight Garner, who later spent two years with the Washington Redskins and retired, was a risk manager with Interim Healthcare. He passed away from prostate cancer at the age of 58 on November 18, 2022, one day before the 125th Big Game, during which Cal commemorated the 40th anniversary of The Play.

Richard Rodgers Sr. played in the CFL and is now an assistant coach in the NFL. His son Richard Rodgers II, who also played for Cal, became a tight end for the Green Bay Packers in 2014. On December 3, 2015, the younger Rodgers had heroics of his own, catching a Hail Mary from Cal alum Aaron Rodgers with no time left to help them beat the Detroit Lions 27–23. The Hail Mary was quickly coined as "The Miracle in Motown". After the game Richard Rodgers II admitted thinking about The Play his father was part of, stating "It's a really special moment for him and I was kind of thinking on the play before, when Aaron got the facemask, I was kind of thinking we would do something like that. Obviously it turned out differently."

Gale Gilbert was the starting quarterback for the Cal Bears. Gilbert is the only player in NFL history to be a member of five straight Super Bowl teams. His son, Garrett Gilbert, was the starting quarterback for the Texas Longhorns, and later for the Dallas Cowboys.

John Tuggle was California's starting fullback in the game.  He finished with 28 carries for 97 yards, a performance that was largely overshadowed by "The Play".  After this, he went on to earn the Mr. Irrelevant award by being selected by the New York Giants with the last pick of the 1983 NFL draft.  Tuggle played most of the 1983 season on special teams,  but was promoted to starting fullback in week 12 when Rob Carpenter went down with an injury.  He finished the season with 17 carries for 49 yards and a touchdown, three receptions for 50 yards, and 9 kickoff returns for 156 yards.  At the end of the season, his teammates voted him special teams player of the year.  In 1984, Tuggle was diagnosed with cancer.  He never played another NFL game and died on August 30, 1986.

After the game Kapp proclaimed, "The Bear would not quit, the Bear would not die."  The phrase became the motto of the Cal team under Kapp.

Rankings

Based on online voting, Pontiac announced the California v. Stanford game of Nov. 20, 1982, as its "Ultimate High-Performance Play of the NCAA," crowning the play as NCAA Football's most memorable moment of all-time in December 2003.

The game was placed in NCAA Football video games as a "College Classic," challenging players to recreate the ending.  The challenge begins with the player controlling the Bears as the Cardinal kick the field goal leading up to the final kickoff.

Joe Starkey's call
Cal announcer Joe Starkey of KGO-AM 810 radio called the game. The following is a transcript of his famous call:

The portion of the call during the officials' deliberation is often edited out when the clip is replayed, making it seem as though Starkey declared Cal the victors immediately after the run.

Similar plays
The Play also provided the apparent inspiration behind the proliferation of game-ending multiple-lateral plays since. Some of the most famous game-ending lateral plays since The Play include:

Music City Miracle (January 8, 2000)

The "Music City Miracle" was, like The Play, a kickoff return with a controversial lateral that resulted in a game-winning touchdown. In an NFL wild-card playoff game between the Tennessee Titans and the Buffalo Bills at the venue now known as Nissan Stadium in Nashville, Tennessee, the Bills took a 16–15 lead on a 41-yard field goal by Steve Christie with 16 seconds remaining. The ensuing kickoff was fielded by the Titans' Lorenzo Neal, who handed the ball off to Frank Wycheck. Faced with oncoming defenders, Wycheck turned to his left and passed the ball across the field to Kevin Dyson, who was protected by a wall of blockers.  Dyson ran untouched 75 yards down the sideline to score a touchdown. Unlike The Play, NFL rules in 2000 allowed for a replay official to call for video review of any questionable on-field call in the final two minutes of a game, and such a review was immediately declared to determine if Wycheck's pass to Dyson was an illegal forward pass. After a lengthy delay, officials determined that video evidence was inconclusive to overturn the ruling on the field, and the play was upheld as a touchdown. Although there were 3 seconds left on the clock when Dyson scored, nothing came of the Bills' ensuing kickoff return and the Titans went on to win the game 22–16. Later, computer analysis established that Dyson caught the ball on the same yard marker that Wycheck threw it from, confirming that the pass was indeed a lateral.

The Titans special teams coach at the time, Alan Lowry, said he got the inspiration for the play from another game in 1982 between Texas Tech and SMU.  The idea was to draw the kickoff coverage to one side of the field and throw the ball back across the field to the other, where a wall of blockers would be set up.

On ABC's television broadcast of the game, color commentator Joe Theismann said immediately after the score, in an obvious reference to The Play, "All that's missing is the band.  That's the only thing missing."

River City Relay (December 21, 2003)

The "River City Relay" was, like The Play, a game-ending multiple-lateral play resulting in a touchdown. It brought the New Orleans Saints to within one point of the Jacksonville Jaguars with no time remaining in a 2003 regular season game at ALLTEL Stadium, now TIAA Bank Field, in Jacksonville, Florida. The Saints needed to win the game to remain eligible for the NFL Playoffs. Unlike The Play, the River City Relay was a play from scrimmage, not a kick-off return. The Relay began with :07 left on the game clock and consisted of a forward pass by Saints quarterback Aaron Brooks which was caught and lateraled three times before they finally scored with no time left. However, the Relay did not tie the game or give New Orleans the lead, and it became as infamous for its aftermath as it was famous for its brilliance; after a long delay, Saints kicker John Carney missed the ensuing extra-point attempt that would have tied the game and resulted in overtime, therefore losing 20–19 to the Jaguars and being eliminated from playoff contention (although, as it turned out, other results on the same day would have eliminated the Saints even if they had won). It is the only three-lateral touchdown in NFL history.

Mississippi Miracle (October 27, 2007)

The "Mississippi Miracle" was, like The Play, a game-winning, multiple-lateral touchdown play. Similar to the "River City Relay" it was a play from scrimmage, and not a kick-off return. It occurred in a 2007 regular-season contest between Trinity University and Millsaps College, both members of the SCAC in NCAA Division III. It took place at Harper Davis Field on Millsaps' campus in Jackson, Mississippi (hence the name). Like the River City Relay, it consisted of a forward pass by Trinity that was caught and lateraled multiple times and resulted in a touchdown. However, the Miracle consisted of an astounding 15 laterals among seven players, six of whom touched the ball multiple times on the play, and covered 60 yards. Trinity had taken the final snap with :02 on the clock and scored after the ball was in play for over a minute of real time, possibly making it the longest play in the history of American football.

Steelers vs. Dolphins lateral (December 8, 2013)
At the end of a game between the Pittsburgh Steelers and Miami Dolphins at Heinz Field during the 2013 NFL season, the Steelers (having surrendered the lead to the Dolphins late in the game) needed to score a touchdown from 79 yards out to win the game. The game's last play, which would also be from scrimmage and not on a kick-off return, brought back memories of The Play. Steelers quarterback Ben Roethlisberger threw a normal forward pass to Emmanuel Sanders, who then lateraled the ball to Jerricho Cotchery, who then lateraled to Le'Veon Bell, who then lateraled to Marcus Gilbert (an offensive tackle), who lateraled it back to Roethlisberger before finally lateraling it to Pro Bowl receiver Antonio Brown. Brown then sprinted down the sidelines into the end zone for what many thought was the game-winning touchdown. However, a referee correctly ruled that Brown had barely stepped out of bounds at the Dolphins 12-yard line. As the clock had expired, there was no time left to run another play, and the Dolphins held on for a 34–28 victory over the Steelers, their first win in Pittsburgh since 1990. There was debate as to whether or not the final lateral between Roethlisberger and Brown was legal as it appeared from some angles to be an illegal forward pass (similar to that of the Music City Miracle); however, since no flag was thrown on the play and it was inconclusive, NFL VP of Officiating Dean Blandino later told NFL.com that the play would have stood had Brown scored. The game wound up having playoff implications for both teams, as the Steelers (who didn't lose the rest of the season after this game) barely missed the playoffs and would have gone instead of the San Diego Chargers had they won one more game at any point during the season; the win kept the Dolphins alive, but they were eliminated in the final week of the regular season after they lost their last two games. They had only needed a win in their final two weeks to clinch the playoff spot ahead of the Chargers.

The "Hail-Lateral" (December 24, 2014)

In the 2014 Bahamas Bowl between Central Michigan and Western Kentucky, Central Michigan had just come back from a 49–14 deficit after three quarters of play to within a touchdown at 49–42.  A WKU punt put Central Michigan at the 25 yard line with :01 left in the game.  Quarterback Cooper Rush heaved the ball 48 yards to Jesse Kroll, who lateraled it to Deion Butler for 10 yards.  When Butler was chased down, he lateraled it to Courtney Williams.  Williams could only advance 2 yards and made another lateral to Titus Davis.  Davis outran 4 other defenders to the corner of the end zone, where he dove in for the touchdown.  Rather than attempt the game-tying extra point to send the game into overtime, the Chippewas elected to attempt a 2-point conversion which would win the game.  Rush's pass to the end zone was broken up, however, and WKU held on for a 49–48 victory.  This play, like "The Play", involved a series of laterals, but it also included a Hail Mary pass, another exceptionally rare play.

The "Debacle in Durham" (October 31, 2015)
The "Debacle in Durham" occurred at the end of a game between the Miami Hurricanes and the Duke Blue Devils in Durham, NC. Like "The Play", the "Debacle in Durham" was a kickoff return that included multiple laterals, a game-winning touchdown, and controversial officiating. After scoring a touchdown and converting a two-point conversion attempt with :06 left to play, Duke lined up to kick off leading 27–24. The Blue Devils squibbed the kick to the Miami 25-yard line, where it was fielded by the Hurricanes' Dallas Crawford. On the ensuing return, Miami executed a series of eight laterals that brought the ball back as far as its own three yard line. On the fourth lateral, Mark Walton tossed the ball to his left as he was being tackled from behind. Though photographs later showed that Walton's knee hit the turf before he released the ball, the officials did not whistle the play dead. The ball eventually found its way to Corn Elder at the Miami ten yard line. Assisted by two crucial blocks from teammate Greg Golden, Elder sprinted down the Miami sideline with a clear path to the end zone. As Elder crossed the Duke 16 yard line, teammate Artie Burns threw a block against a Duke defender, prompting the line judge to throw a flag. After Elder trotted into the end zone, the officiating crew immediately declared a video review and announced the flag as an illegal block in the back by Miami, which would have negated the touchdown and forced Miami to run a final untimed play from its own 8 yard line. However, after a lengthy review, the officiating crew declared that all of the laterals were legal, that no Miami ball carrier had gone down, and that the illegal block they had initially called was legal. The touchdown thus stood and resulted in a 30–27 Miami victory.

After the game, the Atlantic Coast Conference announced that the officials had erred and that the final touchdown should not have counted. According to the ACC, the officiating crew had committed three crucial mistakes: 1) they had incorrectly ruled that Walton was not down on the fourth lateral (though it's unclear whether any video footage that clearly showed Walton's knee hitting the turf was available to the replay official), 2) they reversed the flag they had thrown based on their review of the video footage, which cannot be used to overturn penalties, and 3) they missed a couple of crucial penalties against the Hurricanes involving an illegal block on the back deep in their own territory and illegal participation against one of their bench players without a helmet for entering the playing field before Elder crossed the end zone. Although the outcome of the game could not be changed, the ACC suspended the entire officiating crew for two games.

The Miracle in Miami (December 9, 2018)

In a week 13 game of the 2018 NFL season with the Miami Dolphins receiving the New England Patriots and trailing by five points with seven seconds to go, the Dolphins had the ball at their own 31-yard line. Quarterback Ryan Tannehill threw a pass over the middle that was caught by wide receiver Kenny Stills, who lateraled the ball to the right side of the field that was caught by DeVante Parker at midfield. Parker then tossed the ball to running back Kenyan Drake, who ran the ball 52 yards for a touchdown to win the game 34–33. The Dolphins did not kick the extra point, per the rule change for the 2018 season following the Minneapolis Miracle.

References

External links

Images
 YouTube video of The Play, from CBS' official YouTube channel
 Video of The Play, from the National Football League (NFL)'s official website
 Diagram of the play, as depicted by a University of California, Berkeley student

Articles
 
 

1982 Pacific-10 Conference football season
California Golden Bears football games
Stanford Cardinal football games
November 1982 sports events in the United States
1982 in sports in California
American football incidents
College football controversies
History of the San Francisco Bay Area
Sports in Berkeley, California